Paperless Post is an e-commerce company based in New York City selling online and printed stationery.

History
Paperless Post was founded by sibling entrepreneurs James and Alexa Hirschfeld in 2008 when they were 23 and 25 years old respectively. It began as an online-only company and launched printed stationery in 2012. The company partners with designers like Kate Spade New York to produce original work.

In November 2011, Paperless Post accused e-card competitor Evite of creating a copycat product.

References

External links
 

Retail companies of the United States
Internet properties established in 2008
Companies based in New York City
Privately held companies of the United States